Four referendums were held in Switzerland during 1949. The first two were held on 22 May on revising article 39 of the federal constitution concerning the Swiss National Bank and a federal law amending a 1928 law on measures against tuberculosis, with both rejected by voters. The third was held on 11 September on a popular initiative "for the recurrence to direct democracy" and was narrowly approved. The final one was held on 11 December on a federal law to amend the employment status of federal civil servants, and was also approved.

Background
The referendum on revising the constitution was a mandatory referendum. Together with the popular initiative, both required a double majority; a majority of the popular vote and majority of the cantons. The decision of each canton was based on the vote in that canton. Full cantons counted as one vote, whilst half cantons counted as half. The referendums on federal laws on tuberculosis and civil servants were both optional referendums, which required only a simple majority of votes in favour.

Results

May: Constitutional amendment on the Swiss National Bank

May: Federal law on tuberculosis

September: popular initiative

December: Federal law on civil servants

References

1949 referendums
1949 in Switzerland
Referendums in Switzerland